Christy is a 2023 Indian Malayalam-language romantic drama film. It is the directorial debut of Alvin Henry and was written by Benyamin and G. R. Indugopan based on a story by Alvin Henry. It features Mathew Thomas and Malavika Mohanan as the main leads. The film highlights that it was based on a true story. It released on 17 February 2023.

Plot
The story begins in 2007 and sets in the beautiful backdrop of Poovar. Roy, a 12th-standard student who is not interested in his studies usually skips classes and goes out to enjoy himself with his friends and also starts a dance troupe called "Poovar Boys". He lives with his father's sister for his studies. Knowing that Roy does not go to school regularly his mother tells him to come back home if he is not serious ab about his studies.

So, his aunt decides to send Roy for tuition. Following this Roy goes to the house of a higher secondary teacher named Christy for tuition. When Roy comes home, he sees Christy sitting in the room like a crazy woman and tearing up all the photos. Scared by seeing that, he comes home and says that the teacher is crazy and he won't go there for tuition. Then the next day, while he is leaving for the church, Christy comes to him and tells him to come for tuition tomorrow.

While in school, Roy came across a teacher who informs him that it is only because of his mother's cries and pleas that he is at least allowed to attend the exams, due to this Roy decides to go to the tuition at Christy's home. At her home, as Roy waits for her she comes with her father and he mentions that it was a mutual divorce and hence there were not many problems. Even though Christy distributed sweets, she didn't seem to be happy. Then it is shown that Christy and her father are not in terms, he used to borrow money from her even if she is not interested in giving, and she was married without her consent. One day, when Christy called Roy, his friends began to gossip and make stories about Christy and Roy. As a result, Roy fell for Christy and even during the classes rather than concentrating on what she teaches, he used to stare at her as if he likes her. As the days passed by the friendship between Christy and Roy became closer and Roy's exams approached and he passed the exams smoothly.

Now, Roy has entered college and Roy decides to reveal his love to Christy. When he reaches her home he comes to know that Christy is leaving for an interview for a school in Maldives. Christy is accompanied by her father and Roy to the interview and she successfully clears the interview. When she says to her father that she needs 2 lakhs, her father dashes out in anger. During the return journey by bus, Roy proposes to Christy that he loves her and wishes to marry her. Hearing all this, Christy gets shocked and doesn't reply. Then the day for Christy arrives to join the job in Mali and she leaves for Maldives. Later, Roy is traveling on a bus when Christy calls him. When he tries to call back, his phone doesn't have enough balance, so he gets off the bus and walks into a nearby mobile shop. But, he can't make calls even after recharging and it costs 41 Rs per minute to call there.

A few days pass by and Roy's birthday arrives. On the day, Christy calls him and asks him to meet her at the library. Roy is surprised to see that Christy herself came to him with a gift for him. Later, he takes her to his home. There he kisses her and she gets shocked. All of the sudden due to embarrassment, and anger with a sadness, Christy runs away from there. Christy had given a camera as a birthday gift to Roy. For the next few days, Christy didn't even talk to Roy. The very first picture that Roy clicks on the camera is of Christy and gifts the picture to her. After that, they forget all their problems and start to hang out again as in the past. Resulting in the day-by-day increase in Roy's love for Christy.

One day when Christy is at home, she tells her brother that you should come there sometime, along with all the stories about Mali. Roy next door hears this, knowing that Christy's father is siphoning off all the money she sends, she has opened a new bank account, and Christy calls Roy to the room and secretly gives the ATM card of that account and tells him to check if the money is being sent.

Cast

Production 
Christy is the directorial debut of Alvin Henry. Writers Benyamin and G.R. Indugopan wrote the screenplay of this film. The film was produced by Sajai Sebastian and Kannan Satheeshan through the production company Rocky Mountains Cinemas. Anend C. Chandran was the cinematographer, Sameera Saneesh was the costume designer and Govind Vasantha composed the music.
The film was shot in Poovar and Maldives.

Soundtrack 
Govind Vasantha  is the music director of the movie. He has composed four songs for the film and also did the background scores for the movie.

Release 
The film released in theatres on 17 February 2023. The digital rights of the film is acquired by Sony LIV and started streaming from 10 March 2023. 

The screenplay of the film published by Manorama Books released on 14 February 2023 during the audio launch of the film in Thiruvananthapuram.

Reception 
The film received mixed responses upon release. S. R. Praveen from The Hindu said that the film "portrays a unique relationship convincingly, but the shoddy writing and a poor third act does no justice to the soul of the story." Rating the film 3 in a scale of 5, The Times of Indias reviewer appreciated Malavika Mohanan's performance but felt that the "message conveyed by the film is questionable, and perhaps not even acceptable." Cinema Expresss critic rated the film 3.5 in a scale of 5 and wrote that the film "is one of those love stories that spend enough time exploring the mental landscape of its principal characters." A reviewer from Malayala Manorama wrote that the film is a "celebration of unconditional love." Rating the film 2.5 in a scale of 5, India Today's reviewer appreciated the lead performances but felt that the film's portrayal of the romantic relationship as one-sided.

References

External Links 

2023 films
2023 romantic comedy films
Indian romantic drama films
2020s Malayalam-language films
2023 directorial debut films
High school films
Indian teen romance films
Films scored by Govind Vasantha
Films shot in the Maldives